Lena Malkus (born 6 August 1993 in Bremen) is a German long jumper.

She won the 2010 Summer Youth Olympics, the 2011 European Junior Championships and the 2013 European U23 Championships and won the silver medal at the 2012 World Junior Championships. She also competed at the 2013 and 2015 World Championships without reaching the final.

Her personal best jump is 6.88 metres, achieved in May 2014 in Weinheim.

Competition record

References

 

1993 births
Living people
German female long jumpers
Athletes (track and field) at the 2010 Summer Youth Olympics
World Athletics Championships athletes for Germany
Sportspeople from Bremen
Youth Olympic gold medalists for Germany
Youth Olympic gold medalists in athletics (track and field)
21st-century German women